Halvor Floden (22 July 1884 – 3 December 1956) was a Norwegian schoolteacher, children's writer, novelist, poet and playwright.

Biography
He was born in Trysil to farmer Torgal Olsen Floden and Tea Skjærholde. In 1907 he married teacher and nurse Anne Olsdatter Haugen (1867-1945) and settled as a schoolteacher in Elverum. Through his marriage,  he became the brother-in-law of children's book author Ole Haugen-Flermoe (1878-1956) and newspaper editor Olav Hougen (1890-1943).

Floden made his literary debut in 1911, with the children's book Brør og halvbrør. Among his 24 children's books are Fagerlia from 1915, Frik med fela from 1917, and Kari Trestakk from 1922. His novel Vi har bruk for deg from 1937 treats the subject of exploitation of children. The posthumously Ein fjellgard was issued by Norsk Folkeminnelag in a series on cultural history. He was awarded the Melsom Prize in 1935.

References

1884 births
1956 deaths
People from Trysil
Norwegian schoolteachers
Norwegian children's writers
Norwegian male novelists
20th-century Norwegian poets
Norwegian dramatists and playwrights
Norwegian male poets
20th-century Norwegian novelists
20th-century Norwegian male writers